The  (short for ) is a daily newspaper in Japan published by the  It has the seventh-highest circulation for regional newspapers in Japan. Among Japanese newspapers, the circulation is second only to Yomiuri Shimbun, Seikyo Shimbun, Asahi Shimbun, Chunichi Shimbun, Mainichi Shimbun, the Nikkei, Nikkan Gendai, and Tokyo Sports.

This newspaper is not actually a national newspaper, but a block newspaper whose publishing area is Kansai and Kanto. However, it was classified as a "national newspaper" by the reverse course policy of the business world (Keidanren).

Corporate profile

The Sankei Shimbun is part of the Fujisankei Communications Group and is 40% owned by Fuji Media Holdings. The company is also the owner of Osaka Broadcasting Corporation (OBC, Radio Osaka).

History
The Sankei Shimbun was created by the merger of two older newspapers: Jiji News and Nihon Kogyō Shimbun. Jiji News was founded in 1882 by author, translator, and journalist Fukuzawa Yukichi, who also founded Keio University. Nihon Kogyō Shimbun, founded in 1933 by Hisakichi Maeda, specialized in business and was published by the Minami-Osaka Shimbun (the South Osaka Evening newspaper). In 1941, the Osaka Shimbun (renamed from Minami-Osaka Shimbun) merged with Osaka Jiji Shimpō (Jiji-Shimpō Osaka edition). The following year, Nihon Kogyō Shimbun merged with other business newspapers in Western Japan, and changed its name to the Sangyō Keizai Shimbun (or the Sankei). In 1955, the Sankei merged with Jiji Shimpō. In 1959, the Sankei and Jiji Shimpō were placed under the Sankei Shimbun masthead.

In 1958, the Sankei was acquired by Shigeo Mizuno and Nobutaka Shikanai. After financial difficulties, it changed direction from being liberal to being conservative (Tenkō). Both Mizuno and Shikanai would go on to found Fuji Television a year later.

The Sankei Shimbun started two online newspapers in 1996: Sankei Web, in website style, and E-NEWS, in personal digital assistant style. In 2001, the Sankei Shimbun started a new electronic newspaper delivery edition, NEWSVUE. In 2002, the Sankei Shimbun merged with Osaka Shimbun. Both editions were placed under the Sankei Shimbun masthead. In 2005, the Sankei Shimbun added video to its digital edition, suitable for smartphone, and renamed it as Sankei NetView. In 2007, the Sankei Shimbun started a new online newspaper, in collaboration with Microsoft. In 2014 the Sankei Shimbun rebranded its online news as Sankei News.

in 2017, Sankei Shimbun launched the English language online website Japan Forward.

Ownership
 , a national newspaper.
 , an industry & business & economy newspaper that renamed Nihon Kogyo Shimbun (Japan Industry Newspaper) in March 2004, which ended publication in July 2021.
 , a Japanese daily sports newspaper since 1955.
 , a Japanese daily evening tabloid newspaper since 1969.
 , a horse racing newspaper since 1971.
 , a Kansai regional evening newspaper that suspended publication in 2002.
 , a targeted at young people newspaper founded in 2006.

Political stance
The Sankei Shimbun is a nationalist and conservative newspaper. Some book and media outlets have called the Sankei Shimbun a far-right newspaper; the Sankei Shimbun has previously published books denying the atrocities committed by the Imperial Japanese Army in World War II.

Sankei Award, Sankei Prize
  – An international art prize founded in 1989 awarded by the Imperial family of Japan on behalf of the Japan Art Association in the fields of painting, sculpture, architecture, music, theatre and film.
  – An award founded in 1952.
  – An award commendating  founded in 2002.
  – The oldest children's literature award in Japan.
  – A major kanji (Japanese calligraphy) award founded in 1984.

Philanthropy
  – a medical fund set up in Japan for impoverished children suffering from heart defects.
  – a nonprofit organization for societal welfare.

Offices
 Tokyo Head Office (registered headquarters): Tokyo Sankei Building, 1(Itchome)-7-2, Otemachi, Chiyoda, Tokyo
 Osaka Head Office: Namba Sankei Building, 2(Nichome)-1-57, Minatomachi, Naniwa-ku, Osaka
 Umeda Office: Breeze Tower, 2(Nichome)-4-9, Umeda, Kita-ku, Osaka
 Western Office (Fukuoka): Sunlight Building, 5-23-8, Watanabe-dori, Chuo-ku, Fukuoka

Sankei Group affiliate companies
 Fujisankei Communications Group
It is the flagship station of the Fuji News Network (FNN) and the Fuji Network System.
 Kansai Telecasting Corporation
 FM 802 –  is an FM radio station in Kansai, Japan.
 FM COCOLO –  is a multilingual FM radio station owned and operated by FM 802 Co., Ltd
 Iwate Menkoi Television – Iwate area
 Sendai Television – Miyagi area
 Fukushima Television Broadcasting – Fukushima area
 Niigata Sogo Television – Niigata area
 Nagano Broadcasting Systems – Nagano area television station
 TV Shizuoka – Shizuoka area television station
 Okayama Broadcasting – Okayama area television station
 Ehime Broadcasting – Ehime area television station
 Shinhiroshima Telecasting – Hiroshima area television station
 Kochi Sun Sun Broadcasting – Kochi area television station
 Tokyo Tower –  was the tower's founder and owner.
 FM Osaka – The owner is Hisakichi Maeda's family.
 Japan Airlines – Descendants of Sankei Shimbun Aviation Department

Notable corporate alumni
 Yoshirō Mori, the President of Tokyo Organising Committee of the Olympic and Paralympic Games. the 85th and 86th Prime Minister of Japan.
 Fukushiro Nukaga, former Minister of Finance of Japan
 Eriko Yamatani, politician, former Chairman of the National Public Safety Commission (Japan), former Minister for the Abduction Issue
 Tsuneo Kitamura, politician serving in the House of Councillors (Japan)
 Kenta Matsunami, politician serving in the House of Representatives (Japan)
 Hiroshi Nakatsuka, Japanese politician. Former mayor of Hirakara.
 Shoko Yamaguchi, Legion of Honour in 2013.
 Ryōtarō Shiba, author
 Sakunosuke Oda, author
 Ikko Tanaka, graphic designer worked at 1964 Summer Olympics, Expo '70, Expo '85, Expo '90
 Masami Abe, first reported the abduction of Japanese nationals by the North Korean regime in 1979, for which he was awarded the Japan Newspaper Publishers and Editors Association Award.
 Tsutomu Saitō, Chief operating officer at Sankei. He scooped the Dissolution of the Soviet Union in 1990
 Katsuhiro Kuroda, columnist at Sankei, in Seoul Branch (South Korea)
 Yoshihisa Komori, columnist at Sankei, in Washington, D.C. Branch (United States)
 Tatsuya Kato (journalist), columnist at Sankei, former chief of Seoul branch 
 Ayari Aoyama, writer at sankei. She is butterfly swimmer, at the 1996 Summer Olympics
 Monta Mino, radio and television announcer
 Masato Kimura, freelance journalist, former chief of London Branch (United Kingdom)

Controversy

In August 2014, South Korea filed suit against the Sankei for insults against Park Geun-hye, the president of South Korea, published in one of the newspaper's articles, and demanded Tatsuya Kato, head of the Seoul Bureau, present himself for questioning. The article in question covered several rumors about Park during the Sinking of the MV Sewol, referring to Korean news reports in the Chosun Ilbo; however, only the Sankei was charged with defamation, considered an anti-Korean newspaper in Korea. The Japanese media assumed the suit was a warning to the Sankei. Kato, who was eventually acquitted of defamation charges in December 2015, was under prosecution without detention for a year and two months. The South Korean court said press freedoms were taken into consideration in arriving at Kato's acquittal.

In December 2014, the newspaper apologized after running an advert for Richard Koshimizu promoting anti-semitic books.

On February 11, 2015, regular columnist Ayako Sono wrote an opinion piece opining that though she considered it necessary for Japan to accept more immigrants to bolster its decreasing workforce, it would also be necessary for Japan to take steps to ensure the separation of immigrants in regards to living conditions, citing South African apartheid as an example of how to achieve this goal.

See also
 Anti-Korean sentiment in Japan
 Praemium Imperiale
 Tokyo Marathon
 Osaka International Ladies Marathon
 Japanese media
 Nippon Kaigi
 Japan Institute for National Fundamentals – Yoshiko Sakurai
 Shinzo Abe

Notes

References

External links
 産経ニュース , Sankei News, website since 2014.
 MSN産経ニュース , MSN Sankei News, website in MSN Japan since 2007 till 2014.
 JAPAN Forward -REAL ISSUES, REAL VOICE, REAL JAPAN- English edition of SANKEI, since 2021.

Fujisankei Communications Group
1882 establishments in Japan
1933 establishments in Japan
Anti-communist organizations in Japan
Anti-Korean sentiment in Japan
Companies based in Osaka Prefecture
Companies based in Tokyo
Conservative media in Japan
Daily newspapers published in Japan
Far-right politics in Japan
Historical negationism
Japanese nationalism
Japanese nationalists
Mass media companies based in Tokyo
Nationalist newspapers
Nationalist organizations
North Korean abductions of Japanese citizens
Publications established in 1882
Publications established in 1933
Reactionary
Racial segregation
Right-wing newspapers